The 1938 Lichfield by-election was held on 5 May 1938.  The by-election was held due to the death of the incumbent National Labour MP, James Lovat-Fraser.  It was won by the Labour candidate Cecil Poole.

References

1938 elections in the United Kingdom
1938 in England
20th century in Staffordshire
Politics of Lichfield
By-elections to the Parliament of the United Kingdom in Staffordshire constituencies